Song Ji-young (born 5 May 1996) is a South Korean handball player for SK Sugar Gliders and the South Korean national team.

She participated at the 2017 World Women's Handball Championship.

References

1996 births
Living people
South Korean female handball players